La Flaca may refer to:

 La Flaca (Jarabe de Palo album), 1996, or the title song
 La Flaca (Los Freddy's album), 1967
 El Gordo y la Flaca, a Spanish language entertainment news show
 Yazmith Bataz (born 1972), Mexican athlete nicknamed "La Flaca"
 Joselyn Alejandra Niño, Mexican suspected hitwoman nicknamed "La Flaca"
 "La Flaca", a nickname for la Santa Muerte

See also
 Flaca (disambiguation)